E. William Boyer was an American businessman who was a founder of the Minnesota Vikings.

Bill Boyer Ford
Boyer was an investor in McDonald Gilfillan Motor Company, a Minneapolis automobile dealership founded in 1927. In 1938, the company became a Ford Motor Company franchise holder. In 1952 he became the sole owner of the dealership and renamed it Bill Boyer Ford. In 1958, Boyer began selling Ford heavy commercial trucks.

Minnesota Vikings
In 1959, Boyer, Max Winter, and H. P. Skoglund were awarded the Minneapolis-St. Paul franchise in the new American Football League. In an effort to fight back against the new league, Chicago Bears owner George Halas proposed adding Dallas and Houston to the NFL. However, the ownership group for the proposed Houston franchise backed out after they were unable to find a suitable stadium, which led Boyer's group to withdraw from the AFL and apply for an NFL franchise. On January 28, 1960, Minneapolis was awarded an expansion franchise that would begin playing in 1961. 

Boyer served as president of the Minnesota Vikings from 1960 to 1965, and a vice president until his death. He died at the age of 67 on February 19, 1973, at Palm Springs, California. Boyer helped start the National Football League's Punt, Pass, and Kick competition by presenting the idea, which was conceived by National Football League Properties employee Carl Schroeder, to the league and the Ford Motor Company.

References

1973 deaths
American automobile salespeople
Businesspeople from Minneapolis
Minnesota Vikings owners